The 2012 Leinster Senior Football Championship was that year's installment of the annual Leinster Senior Football Championship held under the auspices of the Leinster GAA. It was won by Dublin who defeated Meath in the final. The winning Dublin team received the Delaney Cup, and automatically advanced to the quarter-final stage of the 2012 All-Ireland Senior Football Championship. They limply exited in the semi-final after defeat to All-Ireland final losers Mayo.

Meath entered the All-Ireland Qualifiers but lost their next game, to Laois.

Bracket

Preliminary round

Quarter-finals

Semi-finals

Final

References

External links
 Leinster GAA website

2L
Leinster Senior Football Championship